Amauroderma rude is a tough woody mushroom in the family Ganodermataceae. A polypore fungus, it is found in Eastern Australia, where it grows as a saprophyte on rotting, buried wood.

Etymology
Amauroderma means "dark/dusky-skinned" (from amauro, meaning "dark or dusky", and derma, meaning "skin"). The second half of the binomen, rude, means "robust".

Description
On the cap underside are small white to pale grey pores that initially turn red when bruised before turning black; this red-staining behaviour is unique in its genus.

References

rude
Fungi described in 1885
Fungi of Australia
Taxa named by Miles Joseph Berkeley